Jonas H. French was a lieutenant colonel in the Union army, 30th infantry from Massachusetts who participated in the Union occupation of New Orleans. Upon occupying over the city, Colonel George F. Shepley had taken over duties of mayor and had appointed "... Major Bell as the recorder of the city, and Capt. Jonas French has been appointed chief of police. These functionaries will take charge of the city until some loyal citizens shall be elected to fill those offices."

French was the provost marshal and chief of police.

French is cited as having the brief term of the 22nd mayor of New Orleans (August 6, 1862 – August 20, 1862) as he was acting military mayor while Godfrey Weitzel was called to Baton Rouge on official business. The personnel remained the same as under Godfrey Weitzel's administration. After Weitzel completed his term, he was succeeded by Henry C. Deming.

See also
List of mayors of New Orleans

References

Mayors of New Orleans